Share My World is the third studio album by American R&B singer Mary J. Blige, released by MCA on Earth Day, April 22, 1997. The album became Blige's first to open at number one on the US Billboard 200 album chart. Moreover, it is her first album where she serves as an executive producer, alongside Steve Stoute, who also shared executive producer credits on the album.

Guest appearances are made by hip hop and R&B stars such as Lil' Kim, Nas, The LOX, George Benson, Roy Ayers and R. Kelly. The album was released to generally positive reviews from most music critics, and earned Blige numerous accolades and nominations, including a Grammy Award nomination for Best R&B Album in 1998. The album became her first to chart in the top ten internationally, including Canada, Sweden and the UK, while it entered the top forty in countries such as New Zealand, Germany and France.

It is certified triple platinum by the Recording Industry Association of America (RIAA) for excess of three million copies sold in the US.

Background 
Share My World marked several personal and professional changes in Blige’s life and career.  Following the departure of label head Andre Harrell the year before, Blige defected from Uptown Records in favor of its MCA parent.  Meanwhile, she severed professional ties with long-time producer, manager and mentor Sean "Puffy" Combs shortly before the production of Share My World began.  His absence was filled with a bevy of high-profile producers, such as: Rodney Jerkins, Jimmy Jam and Terry Lewis, Babyface, Bryce Wilson and R. Kelly.  The end result produced an album that was less entrenched in the hip hop soul of her first two albums, and replaced with a style that was more aligned with R&B.

During the making and run of her second album My Life (1994), Blige had reportedly experienced clinical depression, while also battling drug and alcohol addiction, and enduring an often turbulent relationship with K-Ci Hailey — all of which heavily influenced the dark mood of that album. In late 1996, however, Blige reportedly made a concerted effort to clean up her life and subsequently found herself in more positive frame of mind while recording Share My World, which influenced the albums noticeably lighter mood.

Release and reception

Commercial performance
For the Billboard issue dated May 10, 1997, Share My World debuted at number one on both the US Billboard 200 and R&B Albums chart with sales of 240,000 copies, marking Blige's first official number-one album on the Billboard 200 chart. The album had ended the four-week stint of Life After Death by The Notorious B.I.G., which was released posthumously five weeks earlier.

In addition to debuting number one in the US, the album also debuted in the top ten in countries such as Canada, Sweden and the UK. The album also reached the top forty in France, Germany and New Zealand.

Share My World was certified Platinum by the Recording Industry Association of America (RIAA), for shipments of one million copies in the US on July 1, 1997. On November 17, 1997, Share My World was later certified double platinum by the RIAA and during an episode of MTV Live, Blige was presented with the plaque by host Ananda Lewis.  The album has since sold three million copies domestically by May 1999, garnering Blige's third consecutive album to reach multi-platinum status by the RIAA.

Critical reception

Alex Henderson of AllMusic wrote in his review, "Her strongest and most confident effort up to that point, Share had much more character, personality, and honesty than most of the assembly line fare dominating urban radio in 1997. For all their slickness, emotive cuts like "Get to Know You Better," "Love Is All We Need," and "Keep Your Head" left no doubt that Blige was indeed a singer of depth and substance. Although high tech, the production of everyone from R. Kelly (with whom she duets on the inviting "It's On") and Babyface to Jimmy Jam and Terry Lewis doesn't come across as forced or robotic, but, in fact, is impressively organic." Ernest Hardy of Rolling Stone commended Blige's transition from sound to singing, writing that "On Share My World even Blige's harshest critics will have to concede that she's moved beyond sound to real singing. Listen to "Seven Days," "Missing You" and the already-classic "Not Gon' Cry" (also on the Waiting to Exhale soundtrack), and you hear Blige's signature ache married to newfound technique. There's shading, depth and control in her vocals now." Steve Jones of USA Today said the songs "run the usual gamut of love themes, but it's Blige's powerful, emotional deliveries and street sensibility that separate her from the competition." Village Voice critic Robert Christgau said "Blige is a diva for her own time. As befits her hip hop ethos, she's never soft if often vulnerable, and as befits her hip hop aesthetic, she plays her natural vocal cadences for melodic signature and sometimes hook. She redefines the New York accent for the '90s. And she's taken two straight follow-ups to the next level."

Jonathan Bernstein from Entertainment Weekly was more critical, finding Share My World "uneven" and the songwriting "meandering and half finished." Tom Moon later wrote in The Rolling Stone Album Guide (2004) that the record displayed "Blige's hit-song savvy but fewer memorable performances" than previous albums.

Awards and nominations

Track listing 

Sample credits
"Everything" contains a sample of "You Are Everything" as performed by The Stylistics; "The Payback" as performed by James Brown; "Sukiyaki" as performed by A Taste of Honey.
"Get to Know You Better" contains an interpolation of "My Cherie Amour" as performed by Stevie Wonder.
"I Can Love You" contains a sample of "Queen Bitch" as performed by Lil' Kim.
"Love Is All We Need" contains a sample of "Moonchild" as performed by Rick James.
"Round and Round" contains a sample of "Go Back Home" as performed by Allen Toussaint.
"Share My World" contains an interpolation of "Share My World" by DeBarge.

Personnel 
Credits for Share My World adapted from AllMusic.

Musicians 

 Roy Ayers – Vibraphone
 George Benson – Guitar
 Gene Bianco – String Arrangements, String Conductor, String Contractor
 LaTonya Blige-DaCosta – Vocals (Background)
 Mary J. Blige – Executive Producer, Vocals, Vocals (Background)
 Darryl Brown – Bass
 Mary Brown – Vocals (Background)
 Mike Campbell – Guitar
 Lafayette Carthon, Jr. – Keyboards
 Minio Class – Fender Rhodes
 DJ Do It All – Scratching
 Nathan East – Bass
 Kenneth "Babyface" Edmonds – Arranger, Drum Programming, Keyboards, Musician, Producer
 Basil Fearrington – Bass

 Michael Jordan – Guitar
 R. Kelly – Instrumentation, Mixing, Multi Instruments, Performer, Producer, Vocals, Vocals (Background)
 Lil' Kim – Rap
 The LOX – Rap
 Josh Milan – Keyboards
 Ed Moore – Guitar
 Ed Tree Moore – Guitar
 James Mussen – Drums
 Nas – Rap
 Dunn Pearson, Jr. – Keyboards
 Malik Pendleton – Mixing, Multi Instruments, Producer, Vocal Arrangement, Vocals (Background)
 Mike Scott – Guitar
 Shanice – Vocals (Background)
 Abdulhameed Zuhri – Guitar

Production 

 Dionne Alexander – Hair Stylist
 Bilal Allah – Sequencing
 Engineer
 Kyle Bess – Assistant Engineer, Mixing, Mixing Assistant
 Bob "Bassy" Bob Brackmann – Mixing
 Chris Brickley – Engineer
 Trey Fratt – Assistant Engineer
 Ben Garrison – Engineer
 Jon Gass – Mixing
 Stephen George – Engineer, Mixing, Programming
 Brad Gilderman – Engineer
 Kenny J. Gravillis – Art Direction, Design
 Steve Hodge – Engineer, Mixing
 Jimmy Jam – Arranger, Instrumentation, Multi Instruments, Musical Associate, Producer
 Fred Jerkins III – Mixing, Multi Instruments, Producer
 Rodney Jerkins – Arranger, Drum Arrangements, Drum Programming, Instrumentation, Introduction, Mixing, Multi Instruments, Musician, Producer, Rap, Vocals
 Derek Khan – Stylist
 Jeff Lane – Assistant Engineer
 Ken Lewis – Engineer, Mixing
 Terry Lewis – Arranger, Instrumentation, Multi Instruments, Musical Associate, Producer
 Ron Lowe – Assistant Engineer
 Tony Maserati – Engineer, Mixing
 Mr Lee – Programming
 James Mtume – Keyboards, Producer

 Rich Nice – Arranger, Narrator, Producer
 Appolon "Chap" Noel – Assistant, Assistant Engineer, Engineer
 Nzínga – Make-Up
 One Drop Scott – Arranger, Drum Programming
 George R. "Golden Fingers" Pearson – Keyboards, Producer
 Angela Piva – Engineer, Mixing
 Poke – Arranger, Drum Programming, Producer
 Poke & Tone – Arranger, Drum Programming
 Herb Powers – Mastering
 David Radin – Sequencing
 Dexter Simmons – Engineer, Mixing
 Ivy Skoff – Production Assistant, Production Coordination
 Xavier Smith – Assistant, Assistant Engineer, Mixing, Mixing Assistant
 Steve Stoute – Executive Producer, Sequencing
 Greg Thompson – Assistant Engineer
 Ed Tinley – Assistant, Assistant Engineer, Engineer
 Tizone – Mixing
 Tone – Arranger, Drum Programming, Producer
 Richard Travali – Engineer, Mixing
 Tom Vercillo – Engineer, Mixing
 Randy Walker – MIDI, MIDI Programming, Programming
 Kevin Westenberg – Photography
 Bryce Wilson – Keyboards, Producer

Charts

Weekly charts

Year-end charts

Certifications

See also
List of number-one albums of 1997 (U.S.)
List of number-one R&B albums of 1997 (U.S.)

References

External links 
 Share My World at Discogs

1997 albums
Mary J. Blige albums
Albums produced by Rodney Jerkins
Albums produced by Jimmy Jam and Terry Lewis
Albums produced by R. Kelly
MCA Records albums